Van Holsbeeck is a surname. Notable people with the surname include:

Joe Van Holsbeeck (died 2006), Belgian murder victim
Marnix Van Holsbeeck (born 1957), Belgian radiologist

Surnames of Dutch origin